James Flood (8 October 1875 – 30 November 1918) was an Irish hurler who played with the Limerick senior team.

Born in Caherline, County Limerick, Flood first played competitive hurling in his youth. He quickly established himself on the Caherline team and won county senior championship medals in 1896, 1905 and 1907.

After success at club level, Flood joined the Limerick senior team. He was part of the team that won All-Ireland, Munster and Croke Cup titles in 1897.

Flood was also the Great Great Grandfather of English footballer Harry Kane. Flood was Kane’s Father’s Mother’s Grandfather. 

Flood died on 30 November 1918 as a result of the 1918 flu pandemic.

Honours

Caherline
Limerick Senior Hurling Championship (3): 1896, 1905, 1907

Limerick
All-Ireland Senior Hurling Championship (1): 1897
Munster Senior Hurling Championship (1): 1897
 Croke Cup (1): 1897

References

1875 births
1918 deaths
Limerick inter-county hurlers
Hurling backs
All-Ireland Senior Hurling Championship winners
Caherline hurlers
Deaths from Spanish flu